Çiljeta Xhilaga (born 5 February 1985), also known mononymously as Çiljeta, is an Albanian singer, model and actress.

Biography
Çiljeta was born into an Albanian family in Tirana, Albania, to Ferdinand Xhilaga, an accountant whose family hails from Dibër but who was born in Delvinë, and Majlinda Xhilaga, a hairdresser, from Korçë. She attended the Sami Frashëri High School in Tirana.

Career as model
Xhilaga featured in the Miss Shqipëria competition in 2001 and won the title "Miss Cinema".

Career as singer
Çiljeta distinguished herself in the successful song Dridhe, a collaboration with Getoar Selimi of Tingulli 3nt, a rap group from Kosovo. The song was followed by many successful ones, especially Puçi Puçi, featuring Ingrid Gjoni, and Të dy qajmë të ndarë, a hit composed by Flori Mumajesi and with words of Ardit Roshi in the Kënga Magjike of 2010, where she cried while interpreting the song. Çiljeta had already interpreted in the Kënga Magjike 08 with S'ke ku vete.

Çiljeta participated in the Dancing with the Stars (Albania) show, in its 2011 (second) edition, along with partner Dion Gjinika.

Private life
Çiljeta had a son on February 4, 2013, whom she named after her father. Father of the baby, is reportedly a French architect with a Latin American background.
She is a well known supporter of Partizani Tirana. She is dating Alban Hoxha, an Albanian football player.

Politics
Çiljeta is a supporter of the Democratic Party of Albania, and its leader Lulzim Basha. Earlier, she had sung in New York, in a party organised by Red and Black Alliance, now an extinguished party, but declared that she was unaware of who the organiser of the party was.

She notably had two public reactions against Serbia and Greece politicians: to Serbia after the Serbian government removed a memorial to the Liberation Army of Preševo, Medveđa and Bujanovac in Preševo, an Albanian-inhabited region of Serbia. The second reaction was to Greece, after she saw in television an anti-Albanian interview of Christos Pappas, a politician of the Golden Dawn, a Greek far-right political party. After these declarations, the Greek media attacked her, saying that she claims to be a singer, but must be something else, and published provoking photos of Çiljeta.

Humanitarian activities
On March 20, 2012 Çiljeta was reported by the media to visit a correctional facility for minors, where she met 38 children, a meeting organised by the Institute of Minors, Kavaje, the Centre for the Human Rights of Children of Albania, and UNICEF.

Hits
 Çokollata
 Çuna, Çuna 
 Do do ti do
 Dorëheqja
 Dridhe
 Duty free 
 Falma
 Kur këndoj serenate
 Maria 
 Mike dhë rivale (feat. Ingrid Gjoni)
 Puçi Puçi (feat. Ingrid Gjoni)
 S'ke ku vete
 Të dy qajmë të ndarë
 Tekila
 Vetëm ti
 Nuk e di pse me do

References

External links

21st-century Albanian women singers
Albanian tallava singers
Living people
1985 births
Sami Frashëri High School alumni
People from Tirana
Albanian pop musicians